Nogoyá is a department of the province of Entre Ríos (Argentina).

It is bordered to the west by the Diamante department, to the north by the Paraná and Villaguay departments, to the south by the Victoria and Gualeguay departments and to the east by the Tala department. The department is crossed by the Nogoyá stream.

According to the methodology used by the INDEC for the 1991, 2001 and 2010 censuses, the Nogoyá department comprised 8 localities: Aranguren, Betbeder or Villa Matilde, Don Cristóbal (in the jurisdiction of Don Cristóbal 2 °), Febre, Hernández, Lucas González, Nogoyá, XX of September.

References 

Departments of Entre Ríos Province